Ayanda Precious Bans is a South African politician serving as a Member of the Western Cape Provincial Parliament since May 2019. She is a member of the African National Congress and represents the Central Karoo constituency.

Biography
Bans was born in Murraysburg in the previous Cape Province. She holds a degree from the University of the Western Cape. She was employed in the local economic development sector of the Central Karoo for about twelve years.

Bans had served the African National Congress and its women's league in different positions, including as the regional deputy secretary and as the regional treasurer. She was also the party's regional elections manager.

Prior to the 2019 Western Cape provincial election, she was placed 13th on the ANC's candidate list to the Western Cape Provincial Parliament. Bans was not elected but Ebrahim Rasool declined his seat on the day the new provincial parliament was sworn in. The party selected her to fill his seat, and she was sworn in the next day on 23 May.

References

External links

Living people
Year of birth missing (living people)
African National Congress politicians
21st-century South African politicians
21st-century South African women politicians
Members of the Western Cape Provincial Parliament
People from Beaufort West Local Municipality
University of the Western Cape
Women members of provincial legislatures of South Africa